5 lats coin was a Latvian lat coin minted in 1929, 1931 and 1932. It became a popular symbol of independence during the Soviet occupation. It was reproduced in several modern commemorative coins of Latvia and is used on the national sides of the Latvian 1 and 2 euro coins. The reverse design was featured on the Ls 500 banknote and in watermarks of all lats banknotes.

History 

In February 1929, the Latvian Ministry of Finance decided to issue a 𝓛𝓈 5 circulation coin depicting the head of a maiden, which would symbolize the Republic of Latvia and freedom. The coin was designed by Rihards Zariņš. The image of the maiden on the coin is colloquially known as Milda (a Latvian female name). The model was Zelma Brauere (1900-1977), a proofreader of the State Securities Printing House. She served as a model for other works of the artist, including the 𝓛𝓈 10 and 𝓛𝓈 20 banknotes and the 50s coin.

In 1939, the Latvian government prepared to mint new 𝓛𝓈 5 coins to be issued in 1941. The Latvian maiden was to be replaced by a portrait of the authoritarian leader of Latvia, Kārlis Ulmanis. Those coins were never minted as the Second World War broke out.

After the Soviet occupation of Latvia in 1940, lats continued to circulate alongside the Soviet ruble, although silver coins had largely disappeared from circulation. (Even prior to the war, Latvian people had started to hoard silver coins to prepare for the imminent crisis.) On 25 March 1941, all denominations of lats were abruptly annulled. As the general society was given no prior warning, an estimated 50 million lats were never exchanged for rubles. The people were left with suddenly-worthless coins and bills, except for sentimental value and the silver content in the coins. The Soviet authorities, however, did have 𝓛𝓈 5 coins worth around 𝓛𝓈 3.6 million after the lat was removed from circulation. In 1960, Soviet authorities reportedly sold silver lats coins to foreign numismatists for 28 DEM Around the same time the Soviet Bank started purchasing gold and silver coins of historical currencies. The 𝓛𝓈 5 coin could be sold for 60 kopeks.

Modern usage 
The image of the maiden featured on the reverse of the coin was used in the design of the modern Ls 500 banknote. It is also used as a watermark for all lats banknotes.

Commemorative
The Bank of Latvia has issued two collector coins featuring the imagery of the 𝓛𝓈 5 coin. The first was struck in 2003 as part of the international series The Smallest Gold Coins of the World. The second was struck in 2012 to commemorate the 90th anniversary of the bank. The Bank of Latvia worked with the British Royal Mint, which minted the original coins, to recreate the coin using electrotypes used in minting the original coins.

Latvian Euro coins
In 2004, after a nationwide idea contest, the design was selected for the national side of Latvian Euro coins, and approved as a design for both the 1 and 2 Euro coins issued by Latvia. The edge of the 2 Euro coin features an inscription similar to the one on the edge of the 5 lats coin.

Gallery

See also

References

External links 
 Presentation on making of 2012 commemorative coin

Silver coins
Five-base-unit coins
Economic history of Latvia
National symbols of Latvia